The Chilean football league system, called the Campeonatos Nacionales de Fútbol en Chile or Liga Chilena de Fútbol in Spanish, is a series of interconnected leagues for football clubs in Chile.

Men

2023

Women

2023

References

External links
Information in Spanish
Third Division information in Spanish

      
Chile